Ooredoo Myanmar is a telecommunications company in Myanmar.

History 
In June 2013, Ooredoo was chosen as one of the two successful applicants among 90 bidders to be awarded a license to operate in Myanmar, considered one of the Asia’s last remaining greenfield telecom markets. Formal licenses were granted in January 2014, and Ooredoo pledged an investment of $15 billion to develop Myanmar’s telecoms sector, with plans to cover 75% of the population in five years.

Following the 2021 Myanmar coup d'etat, many foreign companies exited the Burmese market, including competitor Norwegian-owned Telenor Myanmar, due to increasing pressure from military authorities. On 7 September 2022, Ooredoo signed an agreement to sell Ooreedoo Myanmar to Singapore vehicle Nine Communications Pte. Ltd, at a value of $576 million USD, subject to Burmese regulatory approvals. Nine Communications is the subsidiary of zLink Family Office and Nyan Win, which have close ties to the Burmese military officials like Soe Maung. The deal size has courted significant scrutiny for its involvement by business proxies commonly used by the Burmese military, including entities controlled by Zaw Win Shein (of Ayeyar Hinthar) and Jonathan Kyaw Thaung (of KT Group). The announcement of Ooredoo's sale prompted sharp criticism from rights groups, including Access Now, for putting the personal data of 9 million customers at the hands of the Burmese military.

Leadership 
In 2019, Ooredoo Myanmar appointed Rajeev Sethi as its CEO.

See also

 Telenor Myanmar
Mytel
Myanma Posts and Telecommunications
 Telecommunications in Myanmar

References

External links 

 
 
 

Myanmar
Telecommunications companies of Myanmar
Mobile phone companies of Myanmar
Internet service providers of Myanmar
Telecommunications companies established in 2013
2013 establishments in Myanmar